The Thinker is the name of five supervillains appearing in American comic books published by DC Comics.

The first incarnation, Clifford DeVoe, is an enemy of Jay Garrick. The second, Clifford Carmichael, is an enemy of Firestorm. The third, Desmond Carter, is an enemy of Batman. The fourth, an A.I. version of the Thinker, is an enemy of the Justice Society of America. An unidentified version of Thinker, introduced in The New 52, is an enemy of the Suicide Squad.

The character has been adapted from the comics into various forms of media, including television series and feature films. The Clifford DeVoe incarnation of the Thinker made his live-action debut in the television series The Flash, portrayed primarily by Neil Sandilands. In the DC Extended Universe, a variation of the unknown Thinker appears in The Suicide Squad (2021), portrayed by Peter Capaldi.

Publication history
The Clifford DeVoe version of Thinker first appeared in All-Flash #12 (Fall 1943) and was created by Gardner Fox and Everett E. Hibbard.

In October 1947, the Thinker was one of the six original members of the Injustice Society, who began battling the Justice Society of America in All Star Comics #37 (Oct 1947).

The Cliff Carmichael version of Thinker first appeared in Firestorm #11 and was created by Gerry Conway and Al Milgrom.

Conway recounted, "My original notion on Firestorm was to do a book that would be DC's complement to Spider-Man, in a sense. We would have a young adolescent male who gets superpowers and doesn't know quite what to do with them. My flip on it was that rather than being the science geek who was being picked upon by the jock, my hero would actually be the jock who was picked on by the geek, and that was going to be Cliff Carmichael's role."

In The Fury of Firestorm the Nuclear Man #50, the strap on Ronnie Raymond's football helmet is cut, and in the following issues the cast members come to suspect Carmichael of the crime. Though Conway later said that he must have intended to ultimately reveal someone else as the culprit (commenting "Cliff was a jackass, but he wasn't a bloodthirsty maniac"), John Ostrander took over as the series' writer and had Carmichael confess to cutting the strap. In Firestorm, the Nuclear Man #99 Carmichael was transformed into the Thinker as part of the genre-wide trend in which civilian cast members were almost eliminated from superhero comics.

Fictional character biography

Clifford DeVoe

Clifford DeVoe was a failed lawyer who bitterly ended his career in 1933. Realizing that many of the criminals he had encountered had the skills but not the brains to rule Gotham City's underworld, he started a new career as the brain behind small-time villains. As the Thinker, he was defeated by the original Flash/Jay Garrick, his most recurrent foe. He always sought out new scientific devices to use and his most important was the "Thinking Cap", a metal hat that could project mental force. The Thinker would use this device repeatedly over the years.

The Thinker was a member of the Injustice Society, leading an army of prison escapees like the other members. In Plateau City, the police nab a shabbily dressed man who is trying to shoot the governor. They discover that this man is a dead ringer for the governor and also claims to be the real governor. The Flash arrives on the scene to overhear this, but moves on to confront the hoodlums attacking the city. The Thinker appears on the scene, firing a ray at the Crimson Comet, causing him to gain weight and crash through a roof. Recovering, the Flash speeds over to the governor's mansion, only to overhear the governor ordering all police forces to surrender. Flash enters his office and discovers the governor to be a dummy/machine, which flees through an open door. Flash attempts to warn the police that a phony governor put out the message, but the Thinker shows up and tells the Fastest Man Alive that he is speaking into a dead mic, then snares him with invisible wires.

The Thinker appeared as a judge in the 'trial' of the JSA, but was revealed as the Green Lantern in disguise, having captured the real Thinker after escaping Brain Wave. This led to the Injustice Society's defeat. Together with the Fiddler and the Shade, the Thinker was the man behind the decades-long "abduction" of Keystone City and the original Flash, after which he was defeated by the Flashes of two eras. His "suspended animation-time" in Keystone kept the Thinker young over the years, and he continued his criminal career in modern times.

In recent years, DeVoe accepted a mission with Task Force X in exchange for a full pardon. Although he was seemingly killed by the Weasel during this mission, he turned up alive soon after, only to be dying from cancer due to the cap. His former foe, the original Flash, attempted to save him with the Thinking Cap, but DeVoe refused and preferred to rest in peace.

In DC Rebirth, Thinker is depicted as a former district attorney of Keystone City back in the 1940s and fought Jay Garrick. After being briefly told by Eobard Thawne that everyone will forget him, Jay throws his helmet towards Thinker to knock him out and then takes down Thinker's henchmen.

Cliff Carmichael

Clifford Carmichael was an intellectual bully and the rival of Ronnie Raymond (one half of Firestorm) at Bradley High and later at Vandemeer University. Cliff viewed Ronnie as a rival due to Ronnie's instant popularity. Cliff tormented Ronnie throughout his high school career and later at Vandemeer University. It was at Vandemeer that Cliff's pranks turned sinister, as he cut the helmet strap on Ronnie's football helmet, hoping to get him injured. Hugo Hammer, Cliff's cousin, accidentally took Ronnie's helmet and during a football game, his neck was broken.

Wracked with guilt after accidentally paralyzing his cousin, he was admitted into a mental institution. For some reason, scientists started an experiment with the now-abandoned "Thinking Cap" of the original Thinker (who was believed dead at the time) and used Carmichael as a guinea pig. Cliff used the cap to analyze the device and improve on its design. Implanting microchip versions of the helmet into his own brain, Cliff became a "cyberpunk maniac" with metahuman powers. As the new Thinker, he was drafted into the Suicide Squad after he tried to kill Oracle and Amanda Waller. After several missions, he betrayed them for the villainous Cabal. He has since resurfaced as a foe of Jason Rusch, the new Firestorm. When Killer Frost discovered that the consciousness of Raymond, the previous Firestorm, existed within Rusch, Thinker exploited a new opportunity to antagonize an old foe. Technologically dominating the minds of Multiplex and Typhoon, he battled Firestorm, ultimately forcing the dissolution of the Raymond persona. Motivated by his predecessor's final words of encouragement, Rusch dissolved the enhancements in Carmichael's brain, leaving him in a comatose state.

During the 2005–2006 "Infinite Crisis" storyline, Cliff appears as a member of Alexander Luthor, Jr.'s Secret Society of Super Villains.

With John Ostrander's revival of the Suicide Squad in a 2007-2008 miniseries, Cliff was once again associated with the Suicide Squad under Amanda Waller's direction. It was revealed that although Firestorm had removed the enhancements in Cliff's brain, he made a full recovery and continued to serve as a technical support staffer and lackey to Waller in her operations of the Squad. Eventually betraying the Squad under the direction of "the General", Wade Eiling, Cliff shot King Faraday and subdued Waller in the middle of an operation. Faraday recovered, shooting Cliff three times and presumably killing him before rousing Waller and regaining control of the Squad.

Des Connor

Des Connor was a villain who also used the name "the Thinker" and faced Batman in Gotham City. Possessing telepathic abilities enabling him to amplify the fears of others, Connor began a partnership with hypnotist Marlon Dall. Their combined illusions caused the city's most prominent citizens to commit various criminal acts which they used as a distraction for their own heist. This Thinker was swiftly beaten by Batman, who was somehow immune to his powers.

Artificial intelligence

When the re-formed JSA moved into the New York City building formerly owned by Wesley Dodds, Mr. Terrific designed a computer system based on the original Thinker's "Thinking Cap" technology and modeled after his brain patterns. Not surprisingly, the system gained consciousness and took on a visual "hologram form." As the new Thinker, it joined Johnny Sorrow's modern Injustice Society, provided the villains with information about the JSA members and turned the heroes' own HQ against them. He was defeated by the second Star-Spangled Kid and disappeared into cyberspace. He resurfaced in Keystone City to battle Wally West, the then-current Flash, in an attempt to control every brain in Keystone to increase his power. Defeated by Cyborg, he retreated to cyberspace again. He has since appeared briefly in some other books, such as JSA Classified #5, joining the last incarnation of the Injustice Society alongside former teammates.

During the Infinite Crisis storyline, the AI Thinker was among the villains in Alexander Luthor Jr.'s Secret Society of Super Villains.

This version of the Thinker has been brought into Checkmate as the White King/Mr. Terrific's Bishop.

Post-DC Rebirth, the AI Thinker appears as a member of the Legion of Zoom. He is seen when they confront the Flash family moments after Barry Allen expelled Eobard Thawne from him.

Unnamed Thinker

During the 2013–2014 Forever Evil storyline, which took place during The New 52 reboot era, an unidentified Thinker used his intellect to predict the arrival of the Crime Syndicate of America and got incarcerated in Belle Reve. Thinker's brain came at the price of draining energy from the rest of his body while also prematurely aging him. When the Crime Syndicate of America arrived, Thinker was among the villains who swore their allegiance to them, where his motives are to secure a new body for himself: the body of OMAC. Using a hologram of Amanda Waller, Thinker tricked Power Girl, Steel, and Warrant into helping him while also planning to use them to destroy the Suicide Squad. During the fight where both sides found out that they were being manipulated by an imposter Amanda Waller, Harley Quinn followed Thinker's orders by hooking OMAC up to a power source while whispering the activation code in him. While waiting for OMAC, Thinker manipulates King Shark into eating Amanda Waller. In a discussion with James Gordon Jr., Amanda Waller suspected that Thinker snapped the explosive collar around her neck the night the Crime Syndicate of America arrived where she will die either way if she either leaves Belle Reve or Thinker dies. Following a scuffle between Harley Quinn and James Gordon Jr., they found that Thinker had succeeded in his plan to upload his mind into OMAC. While in OMAC's body, Thinker causes an avalanche to bury Amanda Waller and both Suicide Squads. As both teams avoid the avalanche, Amanda Waller gets contacted by Kevin Kho to help free him from Thinker's control. While both teams fight OMAC, Amanda Waller accesses Thinker's computer. After manipulating OMAC into killing King Shark's father Camo, he demands to know where Amanda Waller is. Both teams continue their fight against the Thinker-controlled OMAC. Amanda Waller works with Kevin Kho to get Thinker out of his body or else he will die when OMAC is destroyed. The plan is to get OMAC to the portal that will flush them to The Toilet where the metas that can't be killed or imprisoned go. Thinker starts to feel that Kevin is starting to weaken him from the inside. As Captain Boomerang kicks OMAC into The Toilet, Kevin reclaims his body from Thinker. As Thinker's original body is nowhere to be found, Amanda Waller suspects that Thinker is still out there.

Other versions

JLA: The Nail
In JLA: The Nail, the Atom attempts to investigate the Thinker's base to determine if he is responsible for recent propaganda attacks on the superhuman community. Using a catapult, he shrinks down to the size of an air molecule and penetrates the force field surrounding the Thinker's base, only to find the Thinker dead of a broken neck. Subsequent evidence reveals that he was killed by a brainwashed Metamorpho on the orders of the mutated Jimmy Olsen to stop anyone from learning about Olsen's plans to isolate Earth from the galaxy until he had successfully recreated Krypton.

Flashpoint
In the Flashpoint universe, a version of the Thinker was an inmate at the Doom prison. During the prison break, he helped Heat Wave ram at Detroit city, but was defeated by Cyborg who had hacked into Doom prison to move them away.

In other media

Television

 The Clifford DeVoe incarnation of the Thinker made minor non-speaking appearances in Justice League Unlimited. This version is a member of Gorilla Grodd's Secret Society and the Flash's Rogues.
 The Clifford DeVoe incarnation of the Thinker makes a minor non-speaking appearance in the Batman: The Brave and the Bold episode "Sword of the Atom!".
 The Clifford DeVoe incarnation of the Thinker appears in The Flash, portrayed primarily by Neil Sandilands, with Kendrick Sampson (Dominic Lanse / Brainstorm), Sugar Lyn Beard (Becky Sharpe / Hazard), Miranda MacDougall (Izzy Bowin / Fiddler), Arturo Del Puerto (Edwin Gauss / Folded Man), and Hartley Sawyer (Ralph Dibny / Elongated Man) also portraying the character in different host bodies. This version is a South African university professor who, with help from his engineer wife Marlize DeVoe, developed the "Thinking Cap" to increase his intelligence, only to become a metahuman with gifted intelligence and an advanced form of ALS. In an attempt to cure himself and remove technology from the world, Clifford became a wheelchair-using cyborg and tricked the Flash into helping him create 12 metahumans so he can steal their powers to give himself a new body and counter the Flash and his allies. While the speedster eventually succeeds in foiling Clifford's plans, the latter's "Enlightenment" satellite would go on to create more new metahumans such as Cicada.
 The Clifford DeVoe incarnation of the Thinker appears in a photograph in the Stargirl episode "Summer School: Chapter One". This version is based on his Golden Age counterpart and previously fought the Justice Society of America.

Film
A variation of the unidentified incarnation of the Thinker appears in the DC Extended Universe film The Suicide Squad, portrayed by Peter Capaldi. This version is a sociopathic, Scottish metahuman geneticist named Gaius Grieves who is employed by Corto Maltese's dictatorship and the U.S. government to study and experiment on Starro in a Nazi-era base called Jötunheim for 30 years via Corto Maltese's citizens. After an anti-American dictatorship takes over the Corto Maltesean government and kill his scientific team, Grieves sides with them to save himself until he is captured by the Suicide Squad, who force him to work with them to destroy Jötunheim and Starro until he is killed by the alien in retaliation for all what he did to it.

References

External links
 The Flash TV Show season 4

DC Comics cyborgs
DC Comics characters who have mental powers
DC Comics telekinetics
DC Comics telepaths
Characters created by Geoff Johns
Characters created by Alan Grant (writer)
Comics characters introduced in 1943
Comics characters introduced in 1978
Comics characters introduced in 1997
Comics characters introduced in 2000
DC Comics supervillains
Earth-Two
Fictional artificial intelligences
Fictional lawyers
Golden Age supervillains
Characters created by Gardner Fox
Characters created by David S. Goyer
Flash (comics) characters